Speedball 2: Brutal Deluxe is a remake of Speedball 2: Brutal Deluxe by The Bitmap Brothers for Amiga. The remake was developed by Razorworks and published by Empire Interactive for Xbox 360 via Xbox Live Arcade. The game was released on October 17, 2007.

The game features a conversion of the original 1991 game as well as an option to play it in an enhanced HD 3D mode. It has Xbox Live Arcade features such as Leaderboards and Achievements. The game features larger leagues with more teams, and local and Xbox Live multiplayer modes.

Publisher Empire Interactive was shut down in May 2009, and Speedball 2: Brutal Deluxe was delisted from Xbox Live Arcade shortly thereafter.

Reception

The game received "mixed" reviews according to the review aggregation website Metacritic. Official Xbox Magazine UK gave the game a favorable review, nearly two months before its release date.

References

External links
  (archived)
 

2007 video games
Fantasy sports video games
Razorworks games
Video game remakes
Video games developed in the United Kingdom
Xbox 360 Live Arcade games
Xbox 360 games
Xbox 360-only games
Empire Interactive games
Multiplayer and single-player video games